Unplugged – Rock'n'Roll Realschule is a live album / MTV Unplugged album by German rock band  Die Ärzte. The band performed at Albert-Schweitzer-Gymnasium, Hamburg. The name comes from the song "Rock 'n' Roll High School" by the Ramones.

Track listing 
 "Schrei nach Liebe" [Cry for love]  – 3:54
 "Ich ess' Blumen" [I eat flowers] – 3:23
 "Langweilig" [Boring]  – 3:42
 "Meine Ex(plodierte Freundin)" [My ex(ploded) girlfriend)] – 2:04
 "Monsterparty" – 3:28
 "Hurra" [Hooray] – 3:46
 "Kopfhaut" [Headskin] – 2:42
 "Zu spät" [Too late] – 3:41
 "Westerland" – 4:18
 "1/2 Lovesong" – 4:14
 "Komm zurück" [Come back] – 3:29
 "Der Graf" [The Count] – 3:34
 "Ignorama" – 2:58
 "Is ja irre" [That's crazy] – 1:36
 "Bitte bitte" [Please, please] – 2:59
 "Mit dem Schwert nach Polen, warum René?" [With a sword to Poland, why René?] – 4:36
 "Die Banane" [The banana] – 4:59
 "Manchmal haben Frauen..." [Sometimes, women have...] – 5:28
 "Medley" – 4:59
 "Ohne dich" [Without you]
 "Paul"
 "Quark" [Rubbish; lit: Curd]
 "Schunder-Song"
 "Meine Freunde" [My friends]
 "Nie wieder Krieg, nie mehr Las Vegas!" [No more war, no more Las Vegas!] 
 "Rettet die Wale" [Save the whales] 
 "Der lustige Astronaut" [The merry astronaut]
 "Las Vegas"

The DVD 

Unplugged – Rock'n'Roll Realschule is the first concert DVD and the second DVD by Die Ärzte. The video is based on the concert from 31 August 2002 to the CD from Rock'n'Roll Realschule. On the DVD are nine added tracks, six specials and one hidden track: "Dauerwelle vs. Minipli".

Track listing 
 "Tittenmaus" [Tit mouse]
 "Sommer, Palmen, Sonnenschein" [Summer, palms, sunshine] 
 "Hurra" [Hooray]
 "Blumen" [Flowers]
 "Langweilig" [Boring]
 "Meine Ex(plodierte Freundin)" [My ex(ploded girlfriend)]
 "Monsterparty"
 "Kopfhaut" [Headskin]
 "Ist das alles?" [Is that all?]
 "Schrei nach Liebe" [Cry for love]
 "Zu spät" [Too late]
 "Westerland"
 "1/2 Lovesong"
 "Komm zurück" [Come back]
 "Komm zurück" (video)
 "Der Graf" [The Count]
 "Lieber Tee" [Rather have tea]
 "Ignorama"
 "Is ja irre" [That's crazy]
 "Bitte, bitte" [Please, please]
 "Mit dem Schwert nach Polen, warum René?" [With a sword to Poland, why René?]
 "3-Tage-Bart" [Stubble, lit. 3-days-beard]
 "Die Banane" [The banana]
 "Die Banane" (video)
 "Manchmal haben Frauen..." [Sometimes, women have...]
 "Medley"
 "Ohne dich" [Without you] 
 "Paul"
 "Quark" [Rubbish; lit: Curd]
 "Schunder-Song"
 "Meine Freunde" [My friends]
 "Nie wieder Krieg, nie mehr Las Vegas!" [No more war, no more Las Vegas!]
 "Rettet die Wale" [Save the whales]
 "Der lustige Astronaut" [The funny astronaut]
 "Las Vegas"
 "Gute Nacht" [Good night]

Specials 
 "Westerland" (rehearsal)
 "Der Graf" (rehearsal)
 "3-Tage-Bart" (rehearsal)
 "Mit dem Schwert nach Polen, warum René?" (rehearsal)
 "Schweres Schwert" [difficult sword]
 "Umbaupause" [scene-changing interval]
 "Dauerwelle vs. Minipli" (Plugged)
All of the above are only found as easter eggs on the DVD has a mock-disclaimer stating: "Ach ja... für alle DVD-Geschädigten: Es gibt keinen Hidden-Track... ehrlich." (Oh, by the way for all those who are 'damaged' by DVDs: There is no hidden track... seriously.)

Song information

DVD 
 Track 7 is previously unreleased
 Track 2, 8 is from the EP Uns geht's prima...
 Track 11 is from the album Debil
 Track 9 is from the album Die Ärzte
 Track 4, 12, 20 is from the album Das ist nicht die ganze Wahrheit...
 Track 1 is from the compilation album Die Ärzte früher!
 Track 27 is from the single Teenager Liebe (unecht)/Gute Nacht
 Track 10, 17, 18, 21 is from the album Die Bestie in Menschengestalt
 Track 19 is from the single "Ein Song namens Schunder"
 Track 3, 5, 6, 14, 23 is from the album Planet Punk
 Track 22 is from the album Le Frisur
 Track 13, 16 is from the album 13
 Track 25 is from the album Runter mit den Spendierhosen, Unsichtbarer!

Singles 
2002: "Komm zurück/Die Banane"

Personnel
Farin Urlaub – guitar, vocals
Bela Felsenheimer – drums, vocals
Rodrigo González – bass guitar, vocals
Markus Paßlick – percussion

Charts

Weekly charts

Year-end charts

References

Die Ärzte live albums
2002 live albums
2002 video albums
Live video albums
Die Ärzte video albums